Robert Walter Chandler (15 November 1894 – 1964) was an English professional footballer who made one appearance in the Football League for Aston Villa as a goalkeeper.

Personal life 
Chandler attested as an Air Mechanic 2nd Class in the Royal Air Force during the latter months of the First World War and worked as a fitter.

Career statistics

References

1894 births
Footballers from Kolkata
English footballers
Association football goalkeepers
English Football League players
Royal Air Force personnel of World War I
1964 deaths
Aston Villa F.C. players
Walsall F.C. players
Anglo-Indian people
Military personnel of British India
British people in colonial India